"Careless Whisper" is a song written by George Michael and Andrew Ridgeley. Released on the 1984 Wham! album Make It Big, the single release was credited either to Wham! featuring George Michael (in North America and several other countries) or solely to George Michael (in the United Kingdom and some European countries) as it became apparent, that at some point in the near future, Michael would be embarking on a solo career. 

The song features a prominent saxophone riff, and has been covered by a number of artists since its first release. It was released as a single and became a commercial success around the world. It reached number one in nearly 25 countries, selling about 6 million copies worldwide—2 million of them in the United States.

Background

Composition and writing 
In 1981, Michael was working as a DJ in the Bel Air restaurant near Bushey, Hertfordshire. Michael explained in his autobiography, Bare, that he conceptualised "Careless Whisper" based on events from his childhood. Michael wrote, "I was on my way to DJ at the Bel Air when I wrote 'Careless Whisper'. I have always written on buses, trains and in cars. It always happens on journeys ... With 'Careless Whisper' I remember exactly where it first came to me, where I came up with the sax line ... I remember I was handing the money over to the guy on the bus and I got this line, the sax line ... I wrote it totally in my head. I worked on it for about three months in my head."

"When I was twelve, thirteen, I used to have to chaperone my sister, who was two years older, to an ice rink at Queensway in London," he explained. "There was a girl there with long blonde hair whose name was Jane. I was a fat boy in glasses and I had a big crush on her—though I didn't stand a chance. My sister used to go and do what she wanted when we got to the skating rink and I would spend the afternoon swooning over this girl Jane."

"A few years later, when I was sixteen, I had my first relationship with a girl called Helen," Michael continued.

It had just started to cool off a bit when I discovered that the blonde girl from Queensway had moved in just around the corner from my school. She had moved in right next to where I used to stand and wait for my next-door neighbour, who used to give me a lift home from school. And one day I saw her walk down the path next to me and I thought – now where did SHE come from? She didn't know it was me. It was a few years later and I looked a lot different. Then we played a school disco with The Executive and she saw me singing and decided she fancied me. By this time she was that much older and a big buxom thing – and eventually I started seeing her. She invited me in one day when I was waiting for my lift and I was ... in heaven.

Michael observed that after he stopped wearing glasses, he began getting invited to parties. "And the girl who didn't even see me when I was twelve invited me in," he noted.

So I went out with her for a couple of months but I didn't stop seeing Helen. I thought I was being smart – I had gone from being a total loser to being a two-timer. And I remember my sisters used to give me a hard time because they found out and they really liked the first girl. The whole idea of "Careless Whisper" was the first girl finding out about the second – which she never did. But I started another relationship with a girl called Alexis without finishing the one with Jane. It all got a bit complicated. Jane found out about her and got rid of me ... The whole time I thought I was being cool, being this two-timer, but there really wasn't that much emotion involved. I did feel guilty about the first girl – and I have seen her since – and the idea of the song was about her. "Careless Whisper" was us dancing, because we danced a lot, and the idea was – we are dancing ... but she knows ... and it's finished.

Andrew Ridgeley came up with the chord sequence on his Fender Telecaster he had received for his 18th birthday. They continued to work together on the music and lyric both at Michael's house in Radlett, and Shirlie Holliman's aunt's basement flat in Peckham, where Ridgeley was living.

Demoing
The original demo was recorded by local music producer Paul Mex, in January 1982 alongside those for "Club Tropicana" and "Wham Rap! (Enjoy What You Do)" in the front room of Ridgeley's home (his parents’ lounge turned into a makeshift studio) with Mex's TEAC 4-track Portastudio. Because most of the day was spent on Wham Rap!... and Ridgeley's mother had returned home by that point, Careless Whisper had to be recorded in one take very quickly. It featured a Doctor Rhythm drum machine, an acoustic guitar (played by Ridgeley) and a bass guitar (played by Dave West), with Michael's vocal (recorded with a microphone attached to a broom handle). The overall cost of the recording was £20 (largely due to the rental cost of the Portastudio) and the duo landed a deal with Innervision by Mark Dean on the strength of the demos.

A more complete and fully realised second demo was recorded on 24 March 1982 at Halligan Band Centre, Holloway, London with a backing band and a saxophone riff. However, on the same day, Michael and Ridgely were called over by Dean to sign a contract in addition to the record deal, which they did at a nearby greasy spoon café. Michael recalls of that day:

Production 

The song went through at least two rounds of production. The first was during a trip Michael made to Sheffield, Alabama, where he went to work with producer Jerry Wexler at Muscle Shoals Sound Studio in 1983. Michael was unhappy with the original version produced by Wexler, and decided to re-record and produce the song himself; the second version was the one ultimately released as a single.

After the backing track and George's vocal had been recorded, Wexler had booked the top saxophone player from Los Angeles to fly in and do the solo. "He arrived at eleven and should have been gone by twelve", recalled Wham! manager Simon Napier-Bell. "Instead, after two hours, he was still there while everyone in the studio shuddered with embarrassment. He just couldn't play the opening riff the way George wanted it, the way it had been on the demo. But that had been made two years earlier by a friend of George's who lived round the corner and played sax for fun in the pub."

While the saxophonist appeared to be playing the part perfectly, Michael told him, "No, it's still not right, you see..." and he would lower his head to the talkback microphone and patiently hum the part to him yet again. "It has to twitch upwards a little just there! See...? And not too much."

Napier-Bell consulted with Wexler over Michael's dispute with the sax sound. "Is there really something George wants that's different from what the sax player is playing?" Napier-Bell asked. "Definitely!" replied Wexler.

"I've seen things like this before. There's some tiny nuance that the sax player is somehow not getting right. Although you and I can't hear what it is, it may be the very thing that will make the record a hit. The success of pop records is so ephemeral, so unbelievably unpredictable, we just can't take the risk of being impatient. But this sax player's not going to get it, is he!"

The version Wexler produced was released later in the year, as a (4:41) B-side "Special Version" on 12" in the UK and Japan.

The record label Innervision was going to put out the Wexler version of "Careless Whisper" after the Club Fantastic Megamix as early as 1983. Song publisher Dick Leahy said that while he could not stop the release of the Club Fantastic Megamix, he could stop the release of this single on the basis that as a publisher they "have the right to grant the first license of the recording of a tune of which he controls the copyright". He was unable to do anything about the Club Fantastic Megamix because it was already released material. He said: "We knew how big that song could be, so it was necessary to upset a few people to stop it." Towards the end of 1983, Michael was also committed to touring with Wham! to promote Fantastic, so according to him it would not have made sense to release "Careless Whisper" as a solo single in the middle of the tour, despite it being part of the setlist.

Michael later went back to London's Sarm West's Studio 2 to re-record the track, the backbone of which was done with a live rhythm section in one take, with "loads of stuff bunged on [overdubbed] later" as Michael added, although the feel of it was basically live.

Michael elaborated on the song's production and how it turned out in the end:

After hiring and firing several other different sax players, for which the BBC characterized as struggling to play all the notes with "the right amount of fluidity and still breathe," Michael eventually heard what he was looking for from Steve Gregory.

During an interview with DJ Danny Sun, Gregory said he was the 9th sax player to attempt the riff. Gregory said Michael's secretary had phoned him up midday and asked him to give the solo a try.

The officially released single was issued in August 1984, entering the UK Singles Chart at number 12. Within two weeks it was at number one, ending a nine-week run at the top for "Two Tribes" by Frankie Goes to Hollywood. It stayed at number one for three weeks, going on to become the fifth best-selling single of 1984 in the United Kingdom; outsold only by the two Frankie Goes to Hollywood tracks, "Two Tribes" and "Relax", Stevie Wonder with "I Just Called to Say I Love You", and Band Aid's "Do They Know It's Christmas?". The song also topped the charts in 25 other countries, including the Billboard Hot 100 in the United States in February 1985 under the credit "Wham! featuring George Michael". Spending three weeks at the top in America, the song was later named Billboards number-one song of 1985.

Cash Box said the song illustrates Wham!'s "versatility and range" when compared to the previous single "Wake Me Up Before You Go-Go", calling this song "soft, beguiling and memorable" and saying that it features "a highly romantic instrumental arrangement as well as an extremely well-written melody and lyric." Billboard said that this "saxy ballad will tug at many a heartstring."

Despite the success, Michael was never fond of the song. He said in 1991 that it "was not an integral part of my emotional development ... it disappoints me that you can write a lyric very flippantly—and not a particularly good lyric—and it can mean so much to so many people. That's disillusioning for a writer."

Music video 
The official music video (which uses the shorter single version instead of the full album version and was directed by Duncan Gibbins, who previously directed "Wake Me Up Before You Go-Go") shows the guilt felt by a man (portrayed by Michael) over an affair, and his acknowledgement that his partner (Lisa Stahl) is going to find out. Madeline Andrews-Hodge plays the woman who lures George away. It was filmed on location in Miami, Florida, in February 1984 and features such locales as Coconut Grove and Watson Island. The final part of the video shows Michael leaning out of a top floor balcony of Miami's Grove Towers.

A first original version of the video was edited with the Jerry Wexler 1983 version, and featured Andrew as a cameo, handing over a letter to a dark-haired George. This version had a more detailed storyline, but was then re-edited later.

According to producer Jon Roseman, production of the video was "A fucking disaster". According to Michael's co-star Lisa Stahl, "They lost footage of our kissing scene so we had to reshoot it, which I didn't complain about ... Then George decided he didn't like his hair so he flew his sister over from England to cut it and we had to reshoot more scenes."

As the band felt they had "screwed up" the video, further footage of Michael singing the song onstage was later shot at the Lyceum Theatre, London. The video performance (1984 version) was officially uploaded to the George Michael YouTube channel on 24 October 2009.

Track listing 

Note: The Extended Mix is identical to the album version from Make It Big.

Credits and personnel 
George Michael – lead and backing vocals
Andrew Ridgeley – acoustic guitar (uncredited) 
Steve Gregory – saxophone  
Deon Estus – bass
Trevor Murrell – drums
Chris Parren – keyboards
Andy Richards – keyboards
Anne Dudley – keyboards 
Hugh Burns – electric guitar
Danny Cummings – percussion

Credits adapted from the Extended Mix's liner notes.

Charts

Weekly charts

Year-end charts

All-time charts

Certifications and sales

Cover versions 
"Careless Whisper" has been covered by many other artists. Among the most significant versions are:  
 A dance version by Sarah Washington that peaked at number 45 on the UK Singles Chart in 1993.
Saxophonist Dave Koz recorded a version for his 1999 album The Dance, featuring Montell Jordan on lead vocals. It was released in 2000 as the second single from the album and peaked at number 30 on Billboards Adult Contemporary chart.
 2Play produced a dancehall version in 2004 featuring Thomas Jules and Jucxi D. It charted at number 29 in the UK.
 South African alternative rock band Seether covered the song on their 2007 album Finding Beauty in Negative Spaces. It was released in March 2009 as the fourth single from the album and charted at number 63 in the US. It was certified gold by the RIAA.
 Kamasi Washington and El Debarge performed it to pay tribute to George Michael at the 2017 BET Awards.

See also 
 List of best-selling singles in the United Kingdom
 List of number-one singles in Australia during the 1980s
 List of Dutch Top 40 number-one singles of 1984
 List of number-one singles of 1984 (Ireland)
 List of number-one hits of 1984 (Switzerland)
 List of number-one singles from the 1980s (UK)
 List of RPM number-one singles of 1985
 List of Hot 100 number-one singles of 1985 (U.S.)
 List of number-one adult contemporary singles of 1985 (U.S.)

Notes

References 

1981 songs
1984 debut singles
1993 singles
2000 singles
2004 singles
2009 singles
George Michael songs
Wham! songs
Sarah Washington songs
Dave Koz songs
2Play songs
Seether songs
Billboard Hot 100 number-one singles
Cashbox number-one singles
Dutch Top 40 number-one singles
Irish Singles Chart number-one singles
Number-one singles in Australia
Number-one singles in Iceland
Number-one singles in South Africa
Number-one singles in Switzerland
Oricon International Singles Chart number-one singles
RPM Top Singles number-one singles
UK Singles Chart number-one singles
Songs written by George Michael
Songs written by Andrew Ridgeley
Song recordings produced by George Michael
Pop ballads
Soul ballads
Songs about infidelity
Columbia Records singles
Epic Records singles
Sony Music singles
Songs about dancing
1980s ballads
Number-one singles of the year in the United States
Number-one singles in Italy